Oyster Bay High School is a public high school located in Oyster Bay, New York, United States. The school is a part of the Oyster Bay-East Norwich Central School District.

As of the 2014-15 school year, the school had an enrollment of 759 students and 69.1 classroom teachers (on an FTE basis), for a student–teacher ratio of 11.0:1. There were 115 students (15.2% of enrollment) eligible for free lunch and 18 (2.4% of students) eligible for reduced-cost lunch.

History
The present high school building was built to replace the older one, and was completed in 1929. Though this school has been primarily used as a high school it was originally built to house grades K through 12. This imposing brick and stone building with its Art Deco styling, has some interesting details in the original facade, including gargoyle-like eagles and the letters “B” and “G”. These letters indicate separate doors for the girls and boys to enter the building. In February 1929, the children did just that, carrying their books and personal belongings from the old school building to this one. The new school had many modern features, including classroom loudspeakers, an auditorium with a balcony and projection booth, a central vacuuming system, and one of the most modern gymnasiums in Nassau County.

In 1986, after many years of being an "open campus" (students allowed to leave during free periods), Oyster Bay began to phase into being a "closed campus" (students not permitted to leave during free periods). Sidney Freund, the superintendent, said that the district was responsible for students while they were in school, so they needed to stay in school. Ninth graders, who came in from the eighth grade, were not allowed to leave, followed by each subsequent grade, and, as such, "open campus" was being grandfathered out. Freund said that, in this manner, the new students did not feel that they had lost a privilege, since they never had it.

Though it was modern in its day, after more than 70 years, the school's gym had become outdated; it was the oldest in Nassau County when the district replaced it in 2000 with a new, state-of-the-art gymnasium, dedicated to Howard Imhof. The 2000 additions also included a new library-media center with 18 computer stations, ushering the district's Art Deco high school building into the new century.

Notable alumni
 Marie Colvin (Class of 1974), journalist who worked for the British newspaper The Sunday Times. She died while covering the siege of Homs in Syria
 John Knowles, novelist, transferred to Phillips Exeter Academy
 Ken Labanowski, (Class of 1977), American-Israeli basketball player
 Jackie Martling, comedian, starred on the Howard Stern Show
 Heather Matarazzo, actress
 Thomas Pynchon (Class of 1953), novelist of Gravity's Rainbow and The Crying of Lot 49 once awarded "student of the year." 
 Lee Ranaldo (Class of 1974), musician and writer, co-founder of Sonic Youth. 
 Ken Rosenthal, baseball sportscaster and journalist
 Tage Thompson, professional hockey player

See also

 List of Town of Oyster Bay Landmarks
 National Register of Historic Places listings in Nassau County, New York
 Oyster Bay History Walk

References

External links
Oyster Bay East Norwich School District

Landmarks in Oyster Bay (town), New York
Public high schools in New York (state)
Art Deco architecture in New York (state)
Schools in Nassau County, New York
Public middle schools in New York (state)